This article shows statistics of individual players for the football club HB Køge. It also lists all matches that HB Køge will play in the 2011–12 season.

Players

Squad information
This section show the squad as currently, considering all players who are confirmedly moved in and out.

References

External links
 HB Køge official website

HB Køge seasons
Hb Koge